Volx is a commune in the Alpes-de-Haute-Provence department in the Provence-Alpes-Côte d'Azur region in southeastern France.

Population

See also
 Coteaux de Pierrevert AOC
 Luberon

References

Communes of Alpes-de-Haute-Provence
Alpes-de-Haute-Provence communes articles needing translation from French Wikipedia